Giorgos Kappis' (1928 – May 11, 1999) was a Greek actor in secondary roles in comedy and movies.

Film and theatrical appearances

He took part in many video films in the 1980s due to its survival.

The unforgettable that he remains in the memory of the Piraeus theatrical partner  scene (after the metapolitefsi) went to the stage, the state presented a large closed piaster with raising as much from the inner finger of the edge, in which brought to think that G. Kappis without talking.  After the 2 to 3 minute celebration, he also laughed and he said:

Laugh eh!..., Laugh!..., Laugh!...  All of us for 7 years sit here above! (Γελάτε ε!..., Γελάστε!..., Γελάστε!... Όλοι σας 7 χρόνια καθόσασταν εδώ πάνω! = Gelate e!..., Gelaste!..., Gelaste!... Oloi sas 7 chronia kathsastan edo pano!

Death

He lived poorly, and died in May 1999.  He is buried at Glyfada Cemetery with other relatives.  He had a daughter, Patricia.

Filmography

References

External links

Giorgos Kappis at 90 Lepta  

1928 births
1999 deaths
Greek male film actors
Male actors from Athens